The Electricity and Gas Act 1963 (1963 c. 59) is an Act of the Parliament of the United Kingdom which increased the amounts that could be borrowed by the Electricity Council, the Electricity Boards, the Gas Council, and the Area Gas Boards. It enabled monetary advances to be made to these bodies, and provided for members of the bodies to be recompensed.

Background 
Reports on the gas industry in 1960 and the electricity industry in 1963 had been published by the Parliamentary Select Committee on Nationalised Industries. Both Reports provided insights into the progress and problems of the industries. They identified that future expenditure was likely to be greater than budgeted by earlier legislation. The 1963 Act aimed to address this by increasing the borrowing powers of the Electricity Council and Boards in England and Wales, for the Scottish Electricity Boards, and for the Gas Council and its Boards. It raised the amounts to a limit likely to be reached in about three years which would provide an opportunity for Parliament to review the progress of each industry at approximately three-year intervals.

The Act permitted the Minister of Power to make Treasury advances to the Gas and Electricity Councils and to the Scottish Boards. It also enabled compensation to be provided to a Council or Board member who leaves before their term of office had expired.

Electricity and Gas Act 1963 
The Electricity and Gas Act 1963 (1963 c. 59) received Royal Assent on 18 December 1963. Its long title is ‘An Act to increase the statutory limits imposed on the amounts outstanding in respect of borrowings by the Electricity Council and Electricity Boards and the Gas Council and Area Gas Boards; to make further provision for Exchequer advances to certain of those bodies; to provide in certain cases for compensating members of those bodies for loss of office; and for purposes connected with the matters aforesaid’.

Provisions 
The Act comprises 4 Sections and 3 Schedules

 Section 1  Extension of borrowing powers
 Section 2  Exchequer advances to Electricity and Gas Councils and to Scottish Electricity Boards
 Section 3  Payments to members of Councils and Boards of compensation for loss of office.
 Section 4  Short title, repeal and consequential provision.
 Schedule 1  Amendments relating to Exchequer advances
 Schedule 2  Enactments Repealed
 Schedule 3  Section 47(7) of the Electricity Act 1947 as amended.

Effects of the Act 
The borrowing powers of the Electricity Council, the Central Electricity Generating Board and Area Electricity Boards were increased from £1,400 million (specified in Section 15(5) of the Electricity Act 1957) to £3,300 million or a greater amount not exceeding £4,400 million. The borrowing powers of the Gas Council and Area Gas Boards were increased from £ 250million (specified in Section 42(3) of the Gas Act 1948) to £600 million or a greater amount not exceeding £50 million.

The Act repealed the Electricity (Borrowing Powers) Act 1959 (7 & 8 Eliz. 2 c. 20); and the Electricity (Borrowing Powers) Act 1962 (11 & 12 Eliz. 2 c. 7); and Section 1 of the Gas Act 1960 (8 & 9 Eliz. 2 c.27).

Amendments and repeal 
The Act was amended by the Gas (Borrowing Powers) Act 1965 which set a new budget of £900 million which could be increased to £1,200 million. The 1963 Act was also amended by the Gas and Electricity Act 1968; and by the Electricity Act 1972. The Act was repealed in its entirety by the Electricity Act 1989.

See also 

 Timeline of the UK electricity supply industry
 Gas Boards
 Gas Council
 Central Electricity Generating Board
 Electricity Council

References 

United Kingdom Acts of Parliament 1963
Electric power in the United Kingdom
Natural gas industry in the United Kingdom